The Darbel Islands are a group of islands and rocks extending southwest from Cape Bellue for  across the entrance to Darbel Bay, off the west coast of Graham Land. They were charted in 1930 by Discovery Investigations personnel on the Discovery II and named Marin Darbel Islands after the bay in which they were found. Both names have since been shortened by the UK Antarctic Place-Names Committee.

See also 
 List of Antarctic and sub-Antarctic islands

References 

Islands of Graham Land
Loubet Coast